Evgeny Viktorovich Skachkov (born July 14, 1984) is a Russian-born Romanian professional ice hockey winger who currently plays for HC Ugra of the Kontinental Hockey League (KHL). He was selected by the St. Louis Blues in the 7th round (221st overall) of the 2003 NHL Entry Draft.

Skachkov made his Kontinental Hockey League debut playing with Traktor Chelyabinsk during the inaugural 2008–09 KHL season. He is currently playing for HSC Csíkszereda in the Erste Liga.

Career statistics

Regular season and playoffs

International

References

External links
 

1984 births
Living people
Ak Bars Kazan players
HC CSKA Moscow players
HC Spartak Moscow players
HC Yugra players
Russian ice hockey left wingers
SKA Saint Petersburg players
St. Louis Blues draft picks
Salavat Yulaev Ufa players
HC Sochi players
Torpedo Nizhny Novgorod players
Traktor Chelyabinsk players